Voldemar Jaanus (5 July 1905 Kodila Parish (now Rapla Parish), Kreis Harrien – 19 January 1977) was an Estonian politician. He was a member of VI Riigikogu (its Chamber of Deputies).

References

1905 births
1977 deaths
People from Rapla Parish
People from Kreis Harrien
Communist Party of Estonia politicians
Members of the Riigivolikogu
Members of the Supreme Soviet of the Estonian Soviet Socialist Republic, 1940–1947
Burials at Pärnamäe Cemetery